Argyrophenga is a genus of butterflies that are endemic to New Zealand. It comprises three species that are found in the Southern Alps of the South Island of New Zealand.

Species
 Argyrophenga antipodum Doubleday, 1845 – common tussock or tussock ringlet
 Argyrophenga harrisi Craw, 1978 – Harris's tussock 
 Argyrophenga janitae Craw, 1978 – Janita's tussock

See also
 Butterflies of New Zealand

References

Satyrini
Butterflies of New Zealand
Butterfly genera